Konstantin Mihailović, also known as Constantine of Ostrovica, born in 1430, was a Serbian soldier and author of a memoir of his time as a Jannissary in the army of the Ottoman Empire. Mihailović was born in the village of Ostrovica, near Rudnik in the Serbian Despotate. His book, Memoirs of a Janissary was written at the end of the 15th century, probably between 1490 and 1501, and provides a unique insight into life in the Ottoman Army of the time. Mihailović's stated motivation in writing the book was to provide a detailed account of the Ottoman state and its military structure in order to assist the Christian powers in their struggle against the Ottomans.

Memoirs

His memoirs give no insight into his early life. Instead, they begin in 1455, when an army under the command of Sultan Mehmed II laid siege to the castle of Novo Brdo for forty days. The Ottoman Army had marched from Edirne via Sofia in a campaign to establish certain control over the area that is now Kosovo. At the time, Novo Brdo was a rich mining city for silver. The garrison surrendered on June 1, 1455. According to Mihailović, the Sultan stood at the small gate of the castle and sorted the boys from the girls. He then sorted the women on one side of a ditch, and the men on the other. He then ordered all men of any distinguished rank or importance decapitated. The young women and girls, some 700 of them, were taken and given to soldiers and Ottoman commanders. 

Following this, the young boys, some 320 of them including Mihailović and his two brothers, were taken to be trained as members of the janissaries. He wrote later that he and nineteen other boys ran away during the night near a village called Samokovo, only to be recaptured, bound, and beaten. The area in which he was referring to was most likely Samokovo in Serbia, located about 63 kilometers north of Pristina, and 204 kilometers south of Belgrade.  He writes that one year later he was present at the Siege of Belgrade. While it is likely that he was present, he had not been with the Ottomans long enough to have become a janissary by that time. Mihailović goes into great detail about that siege and the events that followed.

Campaign against Vlad III and in Bosnia

After completing his janissary training, he next serves with the Ottoman Army during its advance against Vlad III of Wallachia, who would later be the inspiration for the novel Dracula by Bram Stoker. In this segment, Mihailović confirms the use of impalement by Vlad III, and adds the fact that Vlad III often cut off the noses of Ottoman soldiers and sent them to Hungary to show the number of enemy soldiers he had killed. He states that in one battle, while the Ottomans were crossing the Danube, some 250 janissaries were killed by the Wallachians, but the sheer numbers of the Ottoman force eventually drove Vlad III's forces away. 

He also records that during the night the Ottomans were most fearful of Wallachian attack, and that they protected their camps with wooden stakes and around the clock guards. This still did not prevent attacks, and they lost many soldiers, camels and horses. He gives some mention of the "forest of the impaled" that has since become legend, in which Vlad III is alleged to have lined the roadways with thousands of impaled Turkish soldiers, but Mihailović never actually saw this, being in the rear of the army, thus writing about it on the word of others. 

His next writings were about the campaign to take Bosnia in 1463. He details the sieges involved in that campaign, and as it comes to a close he and a garrison of janissaries are left to hold the Zvečaj Castle. By this time he seems to have had a considerable rank. His force was not able to withstand a siege led by Matthias Corvinus of Hungary, and Mihailović was one of the prisoners taken. After his identity and ethnicity was discovered, he was repatriated back to his own country.

Works and publications

See also
Johann (Hans) Schiltberger (1380 – c. 1440) Escapee slave of the Ottoman Empire who wrote slave narratives
George of Hungary (c. 1422–1502) Escapee slave of the Ottoman Empire who wrote slave narratives
Emily Ruete , author who wrote narrative about slave mother's captivity. 
Teodosije the Hilandarian (1246-1328), one of the most important Serbian writers in the Middle Ages
Elder Grigorije (fl. 1310–1355), builder of Saint Archangels Monastery
Antonije Bagaš (fl. 1356–1366), bought and restored the Agiou Pavlou monastery
Lazar the Hilandarian (fl. 1404), the first known Serbian and Russian watchmaker
Pachomius the Serb (fl. 1440s-1484), hagiographer of the Russian Church
 Miroslav Gospel
 Gabriel the Hilandarian
 Constantine of Kostenets
 Cyprian, Metropolitan of Kiev and All Rus'
 Gregory Tsamblak
 Isaija the Monk
 Elder Siluan

References

Bibliography 

 Christian Slaves of the Ottoman Empire: An analysis of the fifteenth-century captive lives and writings of Konstantin Mihailović, Johan Schiltberger and Brother George of Mühlenbach ~ Patrick Smith (BA Honours) La Trobe University  Victoria, Australia August 2020

External links
Konstantin Mihailović
Kosovo and Metohija History
Battle of Kosovo and After
History of Novo Brdo
"Memoirs of a Janissary" (currently out of print)
Famous Janissaries

15th-century Serbian historians
Military personnel of the Ottoman Empire
Serbian autobiographers
Memoirists
People from Novo Brdo
People of the Serbian Despotate
15th-century historians from the Ottoman Empire
Janissaries